The Norwegian Grey Troender is a very rare breed of domesticated sheep that originated from crossbreeding native landrace sheep with the now extinct Tautra sheep in the late 19th century. There are currently approximately 50 individual animals, nearly all residing within Norway.

Originally bred in the Trøndelag region of Norway, from where the sheep derives its name, the Grey Troender are most commonly varying shades of grey in color with distinctive white "tear drop" markings under the eyes. However, black, brown and white woolled Grey Troenders occasionally do occur. 

Both rams and ewes are polled and the breed have half-long or variable length tails. The wool of the sheep is uniform with mean fibre diameter of 32.3 micrometres and  greasy fleece weight. The wool was traditionally used for handicrafts and the pelts were used for woolskin rugs. The mean litter size is 1.8 lambs born per year. Lambs are generally slaughtered at 6 months age ( live weight).  

The present population numbers only around 50 sheep but is increasing. In 1998, the Committee on Farm Animal Genetic Resources established a project for collecting and freezing semen from Grey Troender sheep rams in an effort to revive the breed.

References

Sheep breeds
Sheep breeds originating in Norway